Cook High School can refer to:

 Cook High School (Georgia) in Adel, Georgia
 Cook High School (Minnesota) in Cook, Minnesota

See also
 J. C. Cook High School, Wrightsville, Arkansas
 James Cook High School, Manurewa, New Zealand